Enfield station or Enfield railway station may refer to:

In Enfield Town, London:
Enfield Town railway station, formerly known as Enfield station
Enfield Lock railway station, formerly known as Ordnance Factory station
Enfield Chase railway station

In Ireland:
Enfield railway station (Ireland), in County Meath

In the United States:
Enfield station (Connecticut), proposed to reopen in Thompsonville, Connecticut

See also
Enfield (disambiguation)